Yitzhak Galanti (12 February 1937 – 25 June 2012) was an Israeli politician who served as a member of the Knesset for Gil between 2006 and 2009.

Biography
Born in Damascus in Syria, Galanti made aliyah to Mandatory Palestine on 5 May 1945. In 1981 he gained a BA in geography and political science from the University of Haifa. Nine years later he was awarded an MA in geology and archaeology at the same university.

In the 2006 elections he was placed fifth on Gil's list, and entered the Knesset as the party won seven seats. He headed the party's parliamentary group as chairman, and chaired the Knesset's Labour, Welfare and Health committee.

He lost his seat in the 2009 elections when the party failed to cross the electoral threshold.

Galanti lived in Nesher, and was divorced with three children.

References

External links
 

1937 births
Politicians from Damascus
Syrian Jews
Syrian emigrants to Mandatory Palestine
University of Haifa alumni
Members of the 17th Knesset (2006–2009)
2012 deaths
Dor (political party) politicians
Jews in the French Mandate for Syria and the Lebanon
Israeli people of Syrian-Jewish descent